Johan Algot Nilsson (born 5 November 1876 – 13 December 1966) is a retired Swedish bandy player and footballer, who represented Djurgårdens IF Bandy and Djurgårdens IF Fotboll around 1900. Nilsson was part of the Djurgården Swedish champions' team of 1908.

References

Swedish bandy players
Djurgårdens IF Bandy players
Swedish footballers
Djurgårdens IF Fotboll players